The Tribe of Shabazz was, according to the Nation of Islam, a supposed ancient black nation that migrated into central Africa, led by a leader named Shabazz. The concept is found primarily in the writings of Wallace Fard Muhammad and Elijah Muhammad. According to the Autobiography of Malcolm X, all the races except the white race were descendants of the Tribe of Shabazz.

Story 
According to the Nation of Islam, the Tribe of Shabazz was the only survivor of thirteen tribes that lived on earth 66 trillion years ago. After a rogue scientist blew up the planet, splitting off the moon, the other tribes perished. The Tribe of Shabazz relocated to the rich Nile valley of Egypt and the present seat of the Holy City, Mecca, Arabia.

It was a technologically advanced society, but one faction was led by Shabazz himself into previously unoccupied areas of central Africa because he wanted them to be hardened. There they evolved Negroid features. Malcolm X in a 1962 speech stated that,

A scientist named Yakub was a member of the Meccan branch of the tribe and, according to Fard, was the creator of the white race. The Tribe of Shabazz is said to have reached its peak in the year 4084 BC.

Name 

The name may be related to the Arabic words sha'b 'a people', and 'azz 'to be mighty or glorious'.

However, the name's etymology is possibly also related to Indo-European as there is a similar Persian name, Shahbāz (شهباز) meaning 'royal falcon' or 'eagle' (a contraction of shāh, "king" and bāz "hawk, falcon"), popular among Bosnian, Turkish, Indian, and Pakistani Muslims. Shāh is from Old Persian xšāyaθiya "king", itself derived from Proto-Indo-Iranian *ksayati "he controls", ultimately from Proto-Indo-European tkeh1- "to rule, to control land" (c.f. Greek κταομαι ktaómai "to procure, to annex", Sanskrit क्षत्र kṣatra "dominion"). Bāz in turn derives from Middle Persian vāǰ.

Malcolm X used the surname Shabazz from 1949 because he believed himself to be a descendant of the tribe. Members of his family have also used the name, which has also been adopted by other persons.

According to Karl Evanzz, author of the books The Judas Factor: The Plot to Kill Malcolm X  (1992) and The Messenger: The Rise and Fall of Elijah Muhammad (1999), Wallace Fard introduced the name Shabazz into Nation of Islam dogma as he was born in Afghanistan in the district of Shinkay in Zabul Province, according to information contained on his World War I draft card. "Fard" is a common name in this region with a different pronunciation. Qalat is the capital of Zabul Province. Shahbaz and Fard christened Elijah Muhammad's brother "Kallat Muhammad" when he became a minister in the NOI.

Qalandar, a temple named after the Sufi saint Lal Shahbaz Qalandar, is located near Fard's birthplace. The Shrine of Lal Shahbaz Qalandar, the place where he is buried, is а mosque in Sehwan, Pakistan. Shahbazz is a common name in Pakistan. In The Messenger, Evanzz had originally speculated that Fard was the son of Zared Fard, a Māori whose family had lived in Pakistan. Evanzz further alleges that Fard's mother was a Caucasian New Zealander named Beatrice Dodd.

References

External links 
 Muhammad Speaks
 Nation of Islam: The Greatest Story Ever Told
 http://www.seventhfam.com/temple/books/black_man/blk18.htm
 The Official Site of the Tribe of Shabazz

Mythological peoples
Nation of Islam
Pseudohistory